Stenoparmena is a genus of longhorn beetles of the subfamily Lamiinae, containing the following species:

 Stenoparmena crinita Thomson, 1864
 Stenoparmena ferruginea Aurivillius, 1915
 Stenoparmena mussardi Breuning, 1971
 Stenoparmena nigra Breuning & Téocchi, 1983

References

Morimopsini